The Pengra Bridge is a covered bridge near Jasper in the U.S. state of Oregon. The  Howe truss structure carries Place Road over Fall Creek in Lane County. It replaced an earlier bridge, built in 1904, that crossed the creek a few feet further upstream.

Pengra Bridge was named in honor of Byron J. Pengra, a government surveyor. The bridge was listed on the National Register of Historic Places in 1979.

Timbers of this size simplified some aspects of construction but required special techniques to finish and position at the site. Other features of the bridge include ribbon windows under the eaves, a side window on one side, and semi-elliptical arched portals.

Weather and traffic weakened the bridge over time, and it was temporarily closed in 1979. With the help of state funding from the Oregon Covered Bridge Program, the county repaired the structure, which was re-opened to traffic in 1995.

See also
List of bridges documented by the Historic American Engineering Record in Oregon
List of bridges on the National Register of Historic Places in Oregon
List of Oregon covered bridges
National Register of Historic Places listings in Lane County, Oregon
Pengra Pass rail route

References

External links

1938 establishments in Oregon
Bridges completed in 1938
Covered bridges on the National Register of Historic Places in Oregon
Covered bridges in Lane County, Oregon
Historic American Engineering Record in Oregon
National Register of Historic Places in Lane County, Oregon
Road bridges on the National Register of Historic Places in Oregon
Wooden bridges in Oregon
Howe truss bridges in the United States